Nucourt is one of the communes of the Val-d'Oise department in the Île-de-France region of northern France. It is the location of limestone caves which were used as a World War II V-1 flying bomb storage depot.

References

External links

Land use (IAURIF) 
Association of Mayors of the Val d'Oise 

Communes of Val-d'Oise
V-weapon subterranea